This is a list of mayors and chairmen of the City of Fitzroy, a former local government area in  Melbourne, Victoria, Australia and its precedents. It existed from 1858 until 1994 when it merged with the City of Collingwood and City of Richmond to form the new City of Yarra.

Council name

Chairman (1856-1862)

Mayors (1862-1994)

City of Yarra Mayors (from 1996)

See also
 List of mayors of Richmond
 List of mayors of Collingwood

External links
 Yarra City Council

References
 Fitzroy Chairmen and Mayors

Fitzroy
Mayors Fitzroy
Fitzroy, Victoria